Noson Lawen is a long-running Welsh language television series, first broadcast on S4C in Wales in 1982.

The term Noson Lawen translates roughly into English as A Merry Evening. The evening's performance is presented as a live variety show, and consists of family entertainment that includes comedy, music, dance, magic, choirs, sketches and other speciality acts, with a different host every week. Guests have included not only Welsh-speaking performers like Dafydd Iwan, Robin Huw Bowen and John Ogwen, but international stars such as the quartet bond.

In the show's early years the audience were seated on straw bales, with the various performances taking place on a farm trailer. Over the years, the look and feel of the series has changed dramatically. The audience these days sit on comfortable seats, inside a specially made studio. Noson Lawen is recorded at various centres all over Wales and have offered an early stage to some of the biggest talents in Wales.

External links
Official Website

S4C original programming
Variety television series
1982 British television series debuts